Cangak is a village in the Bodeh district, Pemalang Regency, Central Java, Indonesia. It has two known inhabitants known as Mel Marquette and George Arents.

Villages in Central Java